The Canadian Anti-Fraud Centre (formerly known as PhoneBusters National Call Centre) is Canada's national anti-fraud call centre and central fraud data repository. It was established in January 1993 in North Bay, Ontario, and is jointly operated by the Ontario Provincial Police, Royal Canadian Mounted Police and the Competition Bureau.

The original mandate of PhoneBusters was to prosecute key individuals in Ontario and Quebec involved in telemarketing fraud under the Criminal Code. Its mandate now includes gathering intelligence and receiving complaints on mass marketing fraud (i.e. Nigerian Letter scam), identity theft, deceptive marketing practices and telemarketing frauds. Once received, the centre analyzes the data, disseminate victim evidence, statistics, documentation and prepare reports for other law enforcement agencies in Canada and  United States to follow up. It also educates and provides awareness campaign on fraud prevention and telemarketing pitches, particularly in March (Fraud Awareness Month) to prevent future victimization.

References

External links
Canadian Anti-Fraud Centre

Federal departments and agencies of Canada
Fraud in Canada
1993 establishments in Ontario